The awards and decorations of the Pakistan Armed Forces recognize a service member's service and personal accomplishments while a member of the Pakistan Armed Forces. Together with military badges, such awards are a means to outwardly display the highlights of a service member's career. A few of these medals and awards are also given to or have in the past been given to Pakistani civil service officers or civilians with special government permission.

Decorations

Wartime gallantry medals

Peacetime distinguished service medals

Civil Gallantry Awards

Non-Operational Gallantry Awards

Campaign / war medals

Long service medals

Wound stripes

Commemorative medals

Order of wearing

See also
Military decoration
Orders, decorations, and medals of Pakistan

References

External links
 PAF Falcons - Heroes
 The Shaheed Foundation's list of recipients
 Military Award Recipients
 Decorations and Medals of Pakistan
 Pak Army Picks up  Pace Sticking Contest

Military awards and decorations of Pakistan
Pakistan and the Commonwealth of Nations